New Synagogue was a synagogue in Oppeln, Germany (today Opole, Poland). It was built in 1893–1897, designed by Felix Henry. During the Kristallnacht on 9–10 November 1938 Nazis forced Rabbi Hans Hirschberg to set the building on fire.

References

Buildings and structures in Opole
Former Reform synagogues in Poland
Synagogues destroyed during Kristallnacht (Germany)